William Leach may refer to:

 William Elford Leach (1791–1836), English zoologist and marine biologist
 William Leach (politician) (1870–1949), British Labour Party politician, minister in the first Labour government
 William Turnbull Leach (1805–1886), Canadian clergyman and academic
 William Leach (canoeist) (born 1946), American sprint canoer
 William Leach (cricketer, born 1851) (1851–1932), English cricketer
 William Leach (cricketer, born 1883) (1883–1969), English cricketer
 William Leach (Canadian Army officer) (1942–2015)